Fermi Paradox is the 2002 (see 2002 in music) album by the band Tub Ring named after Enrico Fermi's Fermi Paradox.

Track listing
All tracks by Tub Ring

"I Am the Robot" – 1:09
"Invalid" – 3:53
"Future Was Free" – 3:20
"Psychology is B.S. (Not Science)" – 3:08
"At the Seams" – 2:20
"Living with Rene's Head" – 4:21
"Fruit of Knowledge" – 3:27
"Hands" – 0:54
"Negative One" – 3:25
"Fall Back" – 2:35
"Panic the Digital"  – 2:34
"The Subsequent Rating Given to the Life and Times of Jack Valenti" – 3:16
"The Way to Mars" – 5:35

Personnel 

Todd Cooper - percussion
Steve Fallone - mastering
 Jason Fields - bass
Dave Tavares - drums
Kevin Gibson - vocals
Rob Kleiner - keyboards
Paul Long - assistant engineer
Doug McBride - producer, engineer, mixing
Joshua "Cartier" Cutsinger - producer, engineer
Rob Ross - voices
Rahul Sharma - sitar
Shawn Sprinkel - guitar
Dave Winer - trumpet
Rachel Crichton - extra vocals
Callie Coombs - extra vocals
Anthony Soleau - marimba

References

Tub Ring albums
2002 albums